Konstantinos Markoulakis, aka Constantine Markoulakis, born in Athens in 1970, is a Greek director and actor. He graduated from Athens College and he studied in Dramatic School of National Theatre. Since 1991, he has been working continuously in theatre, cinema and television. He has played in successful TV-series and he has won a television award for the TV-series Etsi Xafnika, in 2005. He has also won an Odysseas Award in 2013 London Greek Festival for the film The Telemachy. Markoulakis is active in politics and he was candidate with Drassi.

Filmography

Cinema
Rizoto (2000)
Mia yperohi mera (2003)
Hardcore (2004)Epikindynes mageirikes (2010)The Telemachy (2012)

TV-seriesLogo Timis (1996)I Zoi pou den Ezisa (1998)Na me proseheis (2000)Ax kai na kseres (2002)Etsi Xafnika (2004)Yungermann (2008)Ethniki Ellados'' (2015)

References

External links

Greek male actors
21st-century Greek male actors
1970 births
Living people
Male actors from Athens